Sosicles (Ancient Greek: Σωσικλῆς) was a Roman sculptor in the mid 2nd century AD.  He worked as copyist of ancient Greek masterpieces. He is known from his signature shown on a marble plinth from Tusculum and the column of a marble statue of a wounded Amazon (originally in the collection of Alessandro Albani, Inv. D19; now in the Capitoline Museums, Inv. MC 0651). The marble statue is one of the three Amazon statue types.

References
 Künstlerlexikon der Antike II (2004) 411 s.v. Sosikles (R. Vollkommer).
Hans von Steuben: Die Amazone des Polyklet, in: Polykletforschungen, ed. by Herbert Beck and Dieter Bol, Berlin 1993, pp. 73-102.

External links
 The Three Amazons
 William Smith - The Ancient Library
 AJA Online  

Hellenistic sculptors